Tandsbyn is a locality situated in Östersund Municipality, Jämtland County, Sweden with 374 inhabitants in 2010.

Sports
The following sports clubs are located in Tandsbyn:

 Tandsbyns FK

References 

Populated places in Östersund Municipality
Jämtland